"The Freshmen" is a song by American alternative rock band the Verve Pipe. Released in January 1997 as the third single from their second studio album Villains, the song became the band's breakthrough hit and is the group's highest-charting single, peaking at number five on the US Billboard Hot 100, number six in Canada, and number 28 in Australia.

Background and content
In an interview with Exclusive, lead singer and songwriter Brian Vander Ark stated that the incident which inspired the song was when his pregnant girlfriend had an abortion.

In a 2018 interview with Songfacts, Vander Ark said:

Versions
The song first appeared, in acoustic style, on their 1992 album I've Suffered a Head Injury. It was recorded a second time and released on the band's 1996 album, Villains. Later that year, the band recorded the song again, this time with the producer Jack Joseph Puig, for release as a single in January 1997. Subsequent pressings of Villains replaced the original album version with the single version.

In addition, a slightly modified single version was released to radio, with Vander Ark singing the final lyrics of the second verse ("thinks about her now and how he never really wept") in the same melodic sequence as he sings the homologous lyrics at the end of the first verse ("stop a baby's breath..."), as opposed to his higher-pitched, almost yelled rendering of these lyrics in the version that appeared on the album.

Track listings

US CD single
 "The Freshmen" (album mix) – 4:29
 "The Freshmen" (pop mix) – 4:29
 "The Freshmen" (Studio D version) – 5:06
 "Ominous Man" (album version) – 4:20
 "Spoonful of Sugar" (live) – 4:53

US cassette single
A. "The Freshmen" (album mix) – 4:29
B. "The Freshmen" (pop mix) – 4:29

European and Australian CD single
 "The Freshmen" (mix one) – 4:29
 "The Freshmen" (mix two) – 4:29
 "Ominous Man" (album version) – 4:20
 "Spoonful of Sugar" (live) – 4:53

Charts

Weekly charts

Year-end charts

Certifications

|}

Release history

Cover versions
 In 2004, Skott Freedman released a piano version of the song on his album Judge a Book.
 In 2005, the then-Boston Red Sox pitcher Bronson Arroyo covered the song on his first covers album, Covering the Bases.
 In 2010, Jay Brannan released a soft indie version of the song as a single, "The Freshmen".
 In 2010, Brothers released a melodic hardcore punk version of the song as a bonus track on their EP When I Was Young.

See also
 List of Billboard number-one alternative singles of 1997

References

External links
 Archive of Brian Vander Ark's explanation of the song

The Verve Pipe songs
1997 singles
Bertelsmann Music Group singles
RCA Records singles
Song recordings produced by Jack Joseph Puig
Song recordings produced by Jerry Harrison
Songs about abortion
Songs about suicide